The Giant GRB Ring is a ring of 9 gamma-ray bursts (GRBs) that may be associated with one of the largest known cosmic structures. It was discovered in July 2015 by a team of Hungarian and American astronomers led by L.G. Balazs while analyzing data from different gamma-ray and X-ray telescopes, in particular the Swift Spacecraft.

The ring of GRBs lies at a distance of about 2.8 gigaparsecs (9.1 billion light years) from Earth at the redshift between 0.78 and 0.86 and measures about 1.72 gigaparsecs (5.6 billion light years) in diameter, making it one of the largest structures known.

Typically, the distribution of GRBs in the universe appears in the sets of less than the 2σ distribution, or with fewer than two GRBs in the average data of the point-radius system. Thus, such a concentration as this appears extremely unlikely, given accepted theoretical models. Proposals include the existence of a giant supergalactic structure. This would be an extremely huge structure of the universe, with a mean size of about 5.6 billion light years. Such a supercluster can explain the significant distribution of GRBs because of its tie to star formation. If such a structure did exist, it would be one of the largest structures of the observable universe.

Discovery 

In early July 2015, after the discovery of the Hercules–Corona Borealis Great Wall, I. Horvath, J. Hakkila and Z. Bagoly, among others, conducted a further detailed analysis of the spatial distribution of GRBs within the distant universe. Provided by more than 15 years of data from the Swift Gamma-Ray Burst Mission, amongst other ground-based telescopes, they assessed the data to see if any more structures can be seen using the method of GRB correlation. They noticed a significant clustering of GRBs within z = 0.78–0.86, with nine GRBs concentrated in that region of 43 by 30 degrees of the sky. With further tests and analyses of the clustering, they found out that the sample was indeed having a higher concentration than the expected normal level, indication of a massive galactic structure within the vicinity.

Characteristics

The paper released by the team did not show any data concerning the location of the structure. However, the distance and size was given. It is about 9.1 billion light years from Earth and about 5.6 billion light years across.

See also
 List of largest exoplanets
 List of largest galaxies

References

 
 

Galaxy superclusters
Gamma-ray bursts
Large-scale structure of the cosmos